Kariz-e Now (also Romanized as Kārīz-e Now and Kārīz Now) is a village in Zeberkhan Rural District, Zeberkhan District, Nishapur County, Razavi Khorasan Province, Iran. At the 2006 census, its population was 599, in 163 families.

References 

Populated places in Nishapur County